Caity Baser is an English singer-songwriter, originally from Southampton but based in Brighton. She has had two entries on the UK Singles Chart; "X & Y", which charted at No. 91, and "Pretty Boys" which rose to No. 35 on its second week.

Career
Baser was born in Southampton but is currently based in Brighton. Her brother is a lawyer. In August 2020, she released "Average Student", a song about feeling lost in life, which acquired 1,000,000 views on TikTok, which prompted a management agency to direct message her and invite her to a London studio to meet the producers Future Cut. The day before, she had just worked one shift at the Co-op, which she had taken in order to save money for studio sessions, and the experience caused her to cry her way through her second shift and leave the job on her third. A subsequent single, "Friendly Sex", a song about ending a friendship with benefits after developing feelings for the friend, attracted 6,000,000 streams on Spotify, and has seen use in TikTok videos.  A subsequent single, "X & Y", charted at No. 76 on the UK Singles Chart.

Her debut EP, Thanks for Nothing, See You Never was released in February 2023, and NME described her as "position[ing] herself as a genuine personality with wit and energy to spare. […] However, the EP's production doesn't quite match her gleaming personality." One track on the EP, "Pretty Boys", was written in November 2022, was playlisted by BBC Radio 1, and charted at No. 35 on the UK Singles Chart. She also teamed up with Mae Muller and Stefflon Don on the Sigala track "Feels This Good", released on 3rd March. She was also featured on Radio 1's Future Artists with Jack Saunders.

Baser performed at Reading and Leeds Festival in 2022 on the BBC Introducing stage, a performance that NME described as "a display of pop brilliance by a force of charisma". She is due to perform her first headline tour starting in April 2023. She is a member of Loud LDN, a collective of London-based female and non-binary creatives which counts piri and Venbee among its members.

References

External links
 

Living people
21st-century English singers
21st-century British singers
2002 births